Derek Theler (born October 29, 1986) is an American film and television actor and model.

Acting career
Theler started his acting career in 2009, starring in several minor roles in TV series such as The Middle, Cougar Town, and The Hills.

In between acting gigs, Theler appeared as a model in TV commercials. He first landed a Coke Zero commercial in 2009. This was followed by a campaign for State Farm, in which he played a "hot guy" who was conjured up by three women. He has also been in commercials for Nike, Kayak.com, Arby's, and Verizon.

Aside from acting, he was also the writer and executive producer of a short film called Intrusion. 

In 2012, Theler landed his first major role when he was cast in the ABC Family comedy Baby Daddy, playing Danny Wheeler, the brother of the title character. Also that year, Theler starred as Riggins in the web series Project S.E.R.A.

In 2015, he starred as Chase Walker in the movie Shark Killer, which released on June 16, 2015 via digital download. Theler played the role of shark killer who hunts down a black-finned shark that swallowed a valuable diamond during a gang transaction. He also starred as Jordan in Christmas movie How Sarah Got Her Wings, which was released on digital hd and video on demand on November 1, 2015. The Christmas movie premiered on Ion television on December 6, 2015.

On November 19, 2015, Theler starred in the Funny or Die parody titled Chicago Sanitation. In 2016, Theler starred as Jake Kenman in family movie Secret Summer, which was released on April 2, 2016 on PixL (On Demand and YouTube). He also appeared on short Princess Rap Battle, where he played the role of Huntsman and it was released on YouTube on April 6, 2016.

In 2017, he starred as Chris in the short film Brotherly Love alongside Krista Kalmus. The same year, Theler was cast as Craig Hollis / Mister Immortal in the planned Marvel Cinematic Universe series New Warriors. The series notoriously lost its distributor before it could air proper and was ultimately cancelled. He guest starred in an episode of ABC comedy American Housewife as Dirk. In 2018, he played the role of Aric Dacia/X-O Manowar in the Valiant Entertainment's Ninjak vs. the Valiant Universe. He also guest starred as Conan in the YouTube series Wayne and as Thor a.k.a. Donar the Great in the Starz series American Gods. Theler guest starred in Hulu's web comedy series Dollface playing the role of Ryan, a man Jules has a fling with.

On September 24, 2019, Theler was cast as Sasquatch in the Paramount Network military series 68 Whiskey. In 2022, he guest starred as Billy McShane in an episode of Levergae: Redemption.

Personal life 
Theler was diagnosed with Type 1 Diabetes at age 3. He attended Colorado State University in Fort Collins, Colorado.

He started dating actress Lisa Marie Summerscales in May 2016.  In July 2022, Theler announced on his Instagram that he and Summerscales had become engaged. They got married in September of the same year.

Filmography

Film

Television

Web series

Music

Awards and nominations

References

External links 
 
 

1986 births
Living people
American male television actors
American male film actors
Male actors from Colorado
Colorado State University alumni
Actors from Alaska
People with type 1 diabetes
21st-century American male actors